Marianne Maddalena (born November 15, 1957) is an American film producer. She was born in Lansing, Michigan, and was Wes Craven's producing partner for many years. They had a company together called Craven/Maddalena Films. One of their productions, Wes Craven's New Nightmare was nominated for Best Feature at the Independent Spirit Awards in 1995. Music of the Heart garnered two Oscar nominations; one for Meryl Streep as Best Actress and one for Best Song for "Music of my Heart." Over the years, she produced countless hit films such as Red Eye with Rachel McAdams and Cillian Murphy, the Scream (franchise) and Vampire in Brooklyn with Eddie Murphy. She was behind the US debut of visionary filmmaker Alexandre Aja with The Hills Have Eyes (2006 film). 

Maddalena was an executive producer for the former MTV and now, VH1 series Scream.

In 2021, Maddalena has been made Chevalier of Ordre des Arts et des Lettres which is a recognition of significant contributions to the arts, literature of the French cultural inheritance.

She is an executive producer on Scream (2022 film) film and she is also currently developing a TV show for FX with Dan Mazer.

Her movies grossed over $1 billion at the global box office. 

Wes Craven speaking on the New Nightmare DVD said “Marianne and I have been working in a partnership for almost ten years, and she has been my Guardian Angel of getting us through all the shoals of production and also an inspiration for many of the creative ideas that come through in the making of my Horror pictures.”

Filmography
New York, I Love You
The Last House on the Left
Scream
Scream 2
Scream 3
Scream 4
Music of the Heart
Cursed
The People Under the Stairs
Red Eye (also made an onscreen appearance)
Vampire in Brooklyn
Shocker
The Breed
Wes Craven's New Nightmare (also made an onscreen appearance)
The Hills Have Eyes
Scream (TV series) (2015–2019)
''Scream (2022 film)

References

External links

Film producers from Michigan
Living people
Businesspeople from Lansing, Michigan
1963 births
American women film producers
20th-century American businesspeople
20th-century American businesswomen
21st-century American businesspeople
21st-century American businesswomen